The New Colombo Plan is an initiative of the Australian Government aimed at increasing exchange in the Indo-Pacific region for Australian university students. The plan was launched as a signature initiative of the Abbott government's foreign policy in 2014, and was aimed at enhancing the knowledge of the Indo-Pacific in Australia, by supporting Australian undergraduates studying and undertaking internships in the region. The program consists of two separate streams, the New Colombo Plan Scholarship and the New Colombo Plan Mobility Grant.

In 2014, the pilot scheme supported 40 scholars and more than 1300 mobility students to study and undertake work placements. In 2015 the Scheme expanded further across the Indo-Pacific, awarding 69 scholarships and supporting more than 3,100 mobility students. The scheme was continued by the Turnbull Government. By 2017, the NCP was supporting around 7,400 mobility students and 105 scholarship recipients.

The New Colombo Plan is jointly administered by the Department of Foreign Affairs and Trade (Australia) and Department of Education (Australia, 2019–2020).

The New Colombo Plan involves a prestigious scholarships program for study of up to one year and internships or mentorships, and a flexible mobility grants program for both short and longer-term study, internships, mentorships, practicums and research.

Scholarships
New Colombo Plan Scholarships are highly competitive and prestigious merit scholarships of up to AU$69,000. Scholars receive a dedicated case manager, internship and networking opportunities, and training from the Australian Government departments. Scholars must undertake a credited exchange or study abroad program in the Indo-Pacific, and typically conduct internships, mentorships, language training and community advocacy while abroad.

Scholar selection first consists of Universities nominating up-to 10 students to compete nationally for the Scholarships. Each university varies in nomination selectivity and process. Successful nominees then proceed through Australian Government selection processes. Selection criteria for the Scholarships are:
 Academic excellence at the tertiary level (weighted at 25%);
 Leadership in the community (weighted at 25%);
 Adaptability and resilience (weighted at 25%); and
 Ability to contribute to New Colombo Plan goals (weighted at 25%).

Note: for the 2022 application round, each assessment criterion was given equal weight, at 25% each.

Referee reports from academic and community persons are considered in the application process.

Mobility Grants
Mobility Grants are grants of between AU$3,000 and $7,000 to assist Australian undergraduate university students with short-term study, practicums, research and internships.

See also
Colombo Plan

References

Foreign relations of Australia
 Abbott Government